Bessie Clayton (c. 1875 – July 16, 1948) was an American Broadway, vaudeville and burlesque specialty dancer and choreographer whose near 35-year career began in the era popularly known as the Gay Nineties. Clayton was remembered for her whirlwind style of dance often performed while descending a long flight of stairs. She is considered to be the matriarch of American toe-tap dancing, and the melding of stage dancing and classical ballet. In her obituary, The New York Times called Clayton America’s first native-born prima ballerina.

Biography
The daughter of Irish Immigrants, Bessie Clayton was born in Philadelphia where she received her early instruction from the ballet master, George Washington Smith (1820–1899). She first performed on stage at around the age of eight and with help of a fellow Philadelphian, composer and manager Alfred E. Aarons, made her professional debut some eight years later in Charles Hoyt’s long-running hit  musical, A Trip to Chinatown staged at New York’s Madison Square Theatre. Reportedly Clayton was hired as a temporary one night fill-in after dancer Loie Fuller abruptly left the cast of  A Trip to Chinatown. The diminutive dancer (5’1” as an adult) so impressed Hoyt’s company they employed her for the following six seasons.

On May 23, 1894, Clayton married Hoyt’s choreographer, Julian Mitchell. The couple remained together until 1910, but did not divorce until 1924. Their only child, Priscilla, was born around 1901. Priscilla later married Roger Pryor, the son of bandleader Arthur Pryor. Roger Pryor, also a bandleader, later became a Hollywood actor and a husband of actress Ann Sothern.

Not long after their marriage. Clayton and Mitchell sailed for England where on June 25, 1894, she made her debut engagement there at London’s Lyric Theatre followed a few weeks later with engagements in Paris. Over their time together Clayton and Mitchell often worked together in Charles Hoyt’s productions and later with Joe Weber and Lew Fields, with whom she performed in nearly all of their shows. Between 1898 and 1913 Clayton appeared in a string of mostly successful Broadway productions. She was the premier danseuse in the Ziegfeld Follies of 1909, and spent the remainder of her career  performing on Broadway or with her own company touring various vaudeville circuits.

Clayton retired in 1924 and married her former manager, Bert Cooper (1882–1945). A resident of West Long Branch, New Jersey, where she lived with her granddaughter, Clayton died in 1948 at Hazard Hospital, Long Branch.

From Vaudeville, Old and New by Frank Cullen
What a marvelous whirl of energy is Bessie Clayton. Her suppleness and absolute control [of] muscle and the lightning speed of her movements leave one gasping. She is here, there and everywhere, and always buoyant, light-hearted, inconsequential and full of that restless, tireless nervous energy that animates so much of American life. - Caroline Caffin, author of Vaudeville: the Book, (1914)

See also
 List of dancers

References

External links

1870s births
1948 deaths
American tap dancers
American ballerinas
People from West Long Branch, New Jersey